Rajčinoviće is a village in Novi Pazar, Serbia. It had a population of 537 in 2002 with 529 Bosniaks.

Populated places in Raška District
Novi Pazar